George Fox University is a private Christian university in Newberg, Oregon. Founded as a school for Quakers in 1891, it is now the largest private university in Oregon with more than 4,000 students combined between its main campus in Newberg, its centers in Portland, and Redmond, and online. The  main campus is near downtown Newberg, near the junction of Oregon Route 99W and Oregon Route 219. George Fox competes athletically at the NCAA Division III level in the Northwest Conference as the Bruins. The school colors are navy blue and old gold.

History
The university was founded in Newberg, Oregon, in 1885 by Quaker pioneers, originally called Friends Pacific Academy for several years before becoming a college in 1891 as Pacific College. The cub's mother had been shot, and a Pacific Academy student found the cub and brought it back to campus. Years later, the bear hide became the senior class's unofficial mascot, and other students often attempted to steal it away. After the hide deteriorated, a leather replica was created and called Bruin Jr. Students today still participate in student-government-sponsored class competitions called "Bruin brawls" for possession of Bruin Jr.

In 1893 the school was incorporated as a joint-stock company. It became a four-year school in 1925. Herbert Hoover’s uncle H. J. Minthorn served as the school’s first president, and Hoover was an early student at the academy. The school’s name changed to George Fox College in 1949 to honor George Fox, the founder of the Quaker movement.

From 1991 to 2010, George Fox provided each traditional undergraduate student with a computer. In 1996, the college merged with Western Evangelical Seminary to form George Fox University. Associate professor of biology Dwight Kimberly received the Carnegie Foundation's Oregon Professor of the Year award in 2000. Associate professor of theatre Rhett Luedtke was one of three faculty members nationally to receive a National Directing Fellow Award from the John F. Kennedy Center in 2010.

The student body has grown more than 500% since 1986, when enrollment was 549. With more than 4,000 students in Newberg, Portland, and other Oregon teaching sites, George Fox is now the state's largest private university.

In 2014, prompted by a housing dispute involving a transgender student, George Fox University sought and received an exemption from Title IX's requirements with respect to transgender students.

In 2015, the school completed a new residence hall, Brandt Hall, named for former school president David H. Brandt and his wife, Melva. A new dining hall, Canyon Commons, opened in the fall of 2016.

Academics

George Fox grants degrees at each of the traditional levels of university education, baccalaureate, master's degrees, and doctorates. The university participates in the Richter Scholars program, which sponsors 15 to 25 students each year in encouragement of original research. The university also offers study-abroad opportunities through the "Best Semester" program offered by the Council for Christian Colleges and Universities (CCCU).

Athletics

The George Fox athletic teams are called the Bruins. The university is a member of the Division III level of the National Collegiate Athletic Association (NCAA), primarily competing in the Northwest Conference (NWC) since the 1995–96 academic year. The Bruins previously competed in the Cascade Collegiate Conference (CCC) of the National Association of Intercollegiate Athletics (NAIA) from 1993–94 to 1994–95. They had competed in the NAIA from 1965 before switching affiliation into the NCAA in 1998.

George Fox competes in 23 intercollegiate varsity sports: Men's sports include baseball, basketball, cross country, eSports, football, golf, soccer, swimming, tennis and track & field (indoor and outdoor) for men. Women compete in basketball, cross country, eSports, golf, lacrosse, soccer, softball, swimming, tennis, track & field (indoor and outdoor) and volleyball.

Accomplishments
The Bruins have enjoyed recent success at the national level. The baseball team won the 2004 NCAA Division III national championship, a game that was named one of the top 50 moments in Northwest Sports History by Portland radio station KFXX AM 1080, "The Fan." In 2009, the school's women's basketball team went unbeaten (32–0) and capped the season with a 60–53 defeat of Washington University in St. Louis in the title game. In winning, George Fox claimed the first Division III national women's championship for any program west of the Rocky Mountains. Head coach Scott Rueck was named the NCAA Division III national coach of the year. More recently, the 2011–12  and 2014-15  women's basketball teams reached the championship game of the NCAA Division III tournament. In 2018, the women's track and field team were co-champions with University of Massachusetts Boston

Football
Football was reintroduced as a varsity sport at George Fox in the fall of 2014 after a 45-year hiatus from the sport. The head coach for the resurrection was Chris Casey, brother to former Bruin and current Oregon State Beaver baseball coach Pat Casey.

Student life

George Fox University is a full member of the Council for Christian Colleges and Universities. Students sign a lifestyle agreement, attend required chapel/current-event gatherings, and participate in service projects. No statement of faith or religious preference is required to attend, although the student body is overwhelmingly Christian. Faculty members and staff are required to sign a statement professing faith in traditionally Christian doctrines.

The university hosts dozens of Christian speakers each year through twice-weekly chapel/current-event gatherings. Hundreds of students each year participate in Winter and Spring "Serve trips" throughout the Western United States, Mexico, and Canada. In groups of 10–25, students give a week of either break to provide volunteer labor for missions, homeless shelters, nonprofits, and other charitable causes. Faculty, staff, and students also participate in "Serve Day" each September. A weekday off from work and classes allows over 90% of eligible individuals the opportunity to volunteer at local churches, schools, nonprofits, etc. performing manual labor and maintenance work.

George Fox University is a center for Quaker thought (although only about 5% of the student body are Quakers) and houses an extensive library of historical Quaker literature. The Northwest Yearly Meeting gathers each summer on campus and is headquartered adjacent to GFU. In 1984, the university founded its Center for Peace Learning, now known as the Center for Peace and Justice, as an outgrowth of its connection to the Friends peace testimony.

Campus locations
In addition to its main campus in Newberg, the university teaches classes in two other locations: Portland and Redmond. The Newberg campus includes two structures listed on the National Register of Historic Places. One, Minthorn Hall, was built in 1886 and is still used for classes. The other, Jesse Edwards House, was constructed in 1883 and serves as the residence for the university president.

A variety of student housing is available on Newberg's campus including 23 houses, 10 residence halls, and four apartment buildings.

Rankings

George Fox University is ranked by U.S. News & World Report as a first-tier regional university in the West. According to data compiled by that magazine for its 2014 "America's Best Colleges" issue, George Fox ranks No. 58 out of approximately 1,800 accredited institutions in the nation in percentage of students (49%) studying outside the country before graduation.

In 2011–2012, Kiplinger's Personal Finance magazine rated George Fox among the top four Christian colleges and top 80 private schools nationwide in its "Best Value" assessment.

Notable alumni and educators 

Those who have attended or graduated from George Fox include:
Cherie Buckner-Webb, member of the Idaho Senate
Robert F. Burt, American Navy officer who served as the 24th Chief of Chaplains of the United States Navy from 2006 to 2010
Ken Carter, high school basketball coach for alma mater Richmond High School (inspired the 2005 movie Coach Carter)
Pat Casey, former head baseball coach of the Oregon State Beavers
John Davis, former member of the Oregon House of Representatives
Aaron Elling, professional football placekicker (transferred to University of Wyoming before graduation)
Richard Foster, author of Celebration of Discipline
Peggy Fowler, retired CEO of Portland General Electric
Herbert Hoover, thirty-first President of the United States (attended Pacific Academy before his admission to Stanford)
Rick Johnson, author and speaker
Dan Kimball, pastor and author involved in the Emerging church movement
John Lim, former Oregon politician and businessman
Carmen Guerricagoitia McLean, associate judge on the Superior Court of the District of Columbia
Gina Ochsner, writer
Andy Olson, former member of the Oregon House of Representatives
Darleen Ortega, judge on the Oregon Court of Appeals
Bill Post, former member of the Oregon House of Representatives
Rolf Potts, travel writer
Robert L. Saucy, biblical scholar and professor of systematic theology
Daniel L. Smith-Christopher, theologian and author

Those who have taught at George Fox include:
Stan Bunn, Oregon lawyer and politician, former Superintendent of Public Instruction
Mark David Hall, author on early American history
Mark Hatfield, former Oregon politician and educator
Lynn Lundquist, former Speaker of the Oregon House of Representatives
Leonard Sweet, Visiting Distinguished Professor

References

Further reading
 Ralph Beebe, A Heritage to Honor, A Future to Fulfill: George Fox College, 1891-1991. Newberg, OR: Barclay Press, 1991.

External links
 
 
 Official athletics website

 
Quaker universities and colleges
Educational institutions established in 1885
Universities and colleges accredited by the Northwest Commission on Colleges and Universities
Buildings and structures in Newberg, Oregon
Education in Yamhill County, Oregon
1885 establishments in Oregon
Evangelicalism in Oregon
Council for Christian Colleges and Universities
Private universities and colleges in Oregon